The subfamily Deomyinae consists of four genera of mouse-like rodents that were placed in the subfamilies Murinae and Dendromurinae until very recently.  They are sometimes called the Acomyinae, particularly in references that antedate the discovery that the link rat, Deomys ferugineus, is part of the clade. Deomyinae is the older name and therefore has priority over Acomyinae.

Deomyines share no morphological characteristics that can be used to separate them from other muroids, though subtle aspects of the third upper molar have been suggested.  This subfamily is united solely on the basis of shared genetic mutations.  These conclusions have demonstrated good statistical support using nuclear and mitochondrial DNA, and DNA-DNA hybridization. Actually, all of the species in the subfamily share stiff hairs somewhere on their bodies.

Because of the lack of physical characteristics supporting this group, it is very possible that the subfamily as it is currently recognized is subject to enlargement.  Many of the genera currently placed in the Murinae or Dendromurinae have never been included in a molecular phylogenetic analysis.  Potential surprises await when they are.

All genera are found in Africa, suggesting the deomyines may have originated there.  The spiny mice, Acomys spp., are also found in Asia.

The four genera and 54 species included in the Deomyinae are:

Subfamily Deomyinae
Genus Acomys - spiny mice
Western Saharan spiny mouse, Acomys airensis
Cairo spiny mouse, Acomys cahirinus
Chudeau's spiny mouse, Acomys chudeaui
Asia Minor spiny mouse, Acomys cilicicus
Gray spiny mouse, Acomys cineraceus
Eastern spiny mouse, Acomys dimidiatus
Fiery spiny mouse, Acomys ignitus
Johan's spiny mouse, Acomys johannis
Kemp's spiny mouse, Acomys kempi
Louise's spiny mouse,  Acomys louisae
Crete spiny mouse, Acomys minous
Mullah spiny mouse, Acomys mullah
Cyprus spiny mouse, Acomys nesiotes
Percival's spiny mouse, Acomys percivali
Golden spiny mouse, Acomys russatus
Seurat's spiny mouse, Acomys seurati
Southern African spiny mouse, Acomys spinosissimus
Cape spiny mouse, Acomys subspinosus
Wilson's spiny mouse, Acomys wilsoni
Genus Deomys
Link rat, Deomys ferrugineus
Genus Lophuromys - brush-furred mice
Subgenus Kivumys
Yellow-bellied brush-furred rat, Lophuromys luteogaster
Medium-tailed brush-furred rat, Lophuromys medicaudatus
Woosnam's brush-furred rat, Lophuromys woosnami
Subgenus Lophuromys 
Angolan brush-furred rat, Lophuromys angolensis
Ansorge's brush-furred rat, Lophuromys ansorgei
Gray brush-furred rat, Lophuromys aquilus
Short-tailed brush-furred rat, Lophuromys brevicaudus
Thomas's Ethiopian brush-furred rat, Lophuromys brunneus
Mount Chercher brush-furred rat, Lophuromys chercherensis
Ethiopian forest brush-furred rat, Lophuromys chrysopus
Dieterlen's brush-furred mouse, Lophuromys dieterleni
Dudu's brush-furred rat, Lophuromys dudui
Eisentraut's brush-furred rat, Lophuromys eisentrauti
Yellow-spotted brush-furred rat, Lophuromys flavopunctatus
Hutterer's brush-furred mouse, Lophuromys huttereri
Kilonzo's brush furred rat, Lophuromys kilonzoi
Lophuromys laticeps
Lophuromys machangui
Makundi's brush-furred rat, Lophuromys makundii
Lophuromys margarettae
Black-clawed brush-furred rat, Lophuromys melanonyx
North Western Rift brush-furred rat, Lophuromys menageshae
Fire-bellied brush-furred rat, Lophuromys nudicaudus
Sheko Forest brush-furred rat, Lophuromys pseudosikapusi
Rahm's brush-furred rat, Lophuromys rahmi
Lophuromys rita
Mount Cameroon brush-furred rat, Lophuromys roseveari
Sabuni's brush-furred rat, Lophuromys sabunii
Rusty-bellied brush-furred rat, Lophuromys sikapusi
Lophuromys simensis
Stanley's brush-furred rat, Lophuromys stanleyi
Verhagen's brush-furred mouse, Lophuromys verhageni
Zena's brush-furred rat, Lophuromys zena
Genus Uranomys
Rudd's mouse, Uranomys ruddi

References

Chevret, P., C. Denys, J.-J. Jaeger, J. Michaux, AND F. M. Catzeflis. 1993. Molecular evidence that the spiny mouse (Acomys) is more closely related to gerbils (Gerbillinae) than to the true mice (Murinae). Proceedings of the National Academy of Sciences USA, 90:3433-3436.
Jansa, S. A. and M. Weksler. Phylogeny of muroid rodents: relationships within and among major lineages as determined by IRBP gene sequences.  Molecular Phylogenetics and Evolution, 31:256-276.
Michaux, J., A. Reyes, and F. Catzeflis. 2001. Evolutionary history of the most speciose mammals: molecular phylogeny of muroid rodents. Molecular Biology and Evolution, 17:280-293.
Steppan, S. J., R. A. Adkins, and J. Anderson. 2004. Phylogeny and divergence date estimates of rapid radiations in muroid rodents based on multiple nuclear genes. Systematic Biology, 53:533-553.

 
Mammal subfamilies
.
Taxa named by Oldfield Thomas